Cwmbran Rugby Football Club is a rugby union team from the town of Cwmbran in South Wales. Cwmbran RFC presently play in the Welsh Rugby Union Division Two East League and is a feeder club for the Newport Gwent Dragons.

The club badge of Cwmbran RFC depicts a shield with a crow within it reflecting Cwmbran's translation as 'valley of the crow'.

Several international rugby players started their rugby careers at Cwmbran RFC including Mark Brown, Ian Gough and Ryan Powell  . Cwmbran RFC is established as a community team and has a mini, Junior and youth section.

References

Rugby clubs established in 1880
Welsh rugby union teams
Cwmbran